The Rio Hondo is a  river in southern New Mexico which begins at the confluence of the Rio Bonito and Rio Ruidoso rivers near the town of Hondo, New Mexico. The river flows eastward through the Hondo Valley in the foothills of the Sierra Blanca and Capitan Mountains, roughly paralleling the route of U.S. Route 70 through the towns of Picacho and Tinnie. Near the community of Riverside the river passes through a deep canyon before entering the rolling hills west of Roswell.

The reservoir is typically dry except during the spring runoff. The reservoir also contains the runoff of Rocky Arroyo, an intermittent stream that parallels the Rio Hondo a few miles to the south. Two earth fill dams totaling  in length have the capacity to impound  of water. The two dams act as two separate reservoirs, one for the Rio Hondo and one for Rocky Arroyo unless the water level is very high. Then the Rio Hondo and Rocky Arroyo reservoirs merge into a single large reservoir.

After passing through the reservoir, the Rio Hondo begins to meander through the flat land of the Pecos River valley. In many areas the natural route of the river has been altered. This is especially true in the city of Roswell where the river has been lined with concrete or paving stones. In Roswell a small tributary, the Spring River, joins the Hondo.

The upper stretch of the river typically flows year-round, however irrigation along the length of the river siphons off much of the natural flow. By the time the river reaches Roswell it is dry, except after storms and during the spring runoff from the mountains.

See also
 List of rivers of New Mexico
 List of tributaries of the Rio Grande

References

External links
 "The Hondo Valley — Picacho, Tinnie, Arabela, Hondo, and San Patricio" SouthernNewMexico.com

Tributaries of the Rio Grande
Rivers of New Mexico
Rivers of Lincoln County, New Mexico
Rivers of Chaves County, New Mexico